Dancemania X1, a.k.a. Dancemania 11, is the eleventh set in the Dancemania series of dance music compilation albums, released in 1999 by EMI Music Japan.

The album debuted at #4 on Oricon's weekly album chart in January 1999, reached #2 in February 1999, and appeared on the yearly best-selling album chart at #77 in 1999 with 304,710 copies sold, along with several other Dancemania albums such as Speed 2 being #72 and Delux 3 being #88.

Several tracks on the album, including different remixes, can also be found on other Dancemania albums such as Disco Groove, Delux 3, Delux 4, Diamond, Diamond Complete Edition, Best Yellow, Best Red, Zip Mania II, Zip Mania Best, Fura Mania, Speed 2, Speed 3, Speed 7, Speed Best 2001 or Happy Paradise.


Tracks

Further details

The album's full length is 76:00.
The longest track is "Kiss Me" (#1) at 4:18.
The shortest track is "Everybody" (#17) at 2:34.
The album's overall average tempo is 138 bpm;
The fastest track is "Paradise" (#24) at 150 bpm.
The lowest bpm is 128; #3–4
Several tracks are cover versions or remix versions.
#3 "September " is a remix of Earth, Wind & Fire's "September".
#4 "I Believe In Miracles" is a remix / cover of The Jackson Sisters' "Miracles".
#5 "Jump" is a cover of Van Halen's "Jump".
#6 "Hot Stuff" is a cover of Donna Summer's "Hot Stuff".
#7 "Save Tonight" is a cover of Eagle-Eye Cherry's "Save Tonight".
#15 "To Love You More" is a cover of Celine Dion's "To Love You More".
#16 "My Heart Will Go On" is a cover of Celine Dion's "My Heart Will Go On".
The non-stop mixing was done by Mitsugu Matsumoto, a member of the DJ team MST.

References

X1
1999 compilation albums
Dance music compilation albums